The Ambassador of Australia to Lebanon is an officer of the Australian Department of Foreign Affairs and Trade and the head of the Embassy of the Commonwealth of Australia to the Republic of Lebanon. The Ambassador resides in Beirut. The current ambassador, since April 2022, is Andrew Barnes,

List of heads of mission

Notes
 Also served concurrently as non-resident Ambassador of Australia to the Hashemite Kingdom of Jordan, 1979 to 1984.

References

 
Lebanon
Australia